Lyodra Margareta Ginting (born 21 June 2003) is an Indonesian singer from Medan, North Sumatra. She was the winner of the A3 category (aged 13–15 years) at the 2017 Sanremo Junior children's international solo singing competition in Sanremo, Italy, and the winner of the tenth season of Indonesian Idol. In both competitions, Lyodra practiced the use of the whistle register, which is the highest range of the human voice—higher than falsetto. She was listed as the youngest Indonesian Idol champion, at the age of 16 years and 255 days. She was awarded "Best Children Female Solo Artist" from 20th Anugerah Musik Indonesia Awards, and "Best New Asian Artist in Indonesia" from 2021 Mnet Asian Music Award. In addition, Lyodra was nominated for "Best Southeast Asian Act" from 2021 MTV Europe Music Awards.

Early life and education 
Lyodra was born with the name Lyodra Margareta Ginting on 21 June 2003 in Medan City, North Sumatra Province. She was raised in a Catholic family and was given the baptismal name Margareta. The first name Lyodra itself is a modification or another form of the female name in Hebrew, Liora, which means "Light". Lyodra is the eldest of two children, from entrepreneur Simar Ginting and psychiatric nurse Natalia Johanna Tarigan. She is known to have a younger brother who is two years apart named Igyralo Ginting.

Lyodra's singing talent began to show since she was 2 years old. When she was 4 years old, she already participated in local singing competitions in Medan City. According to her father, Lyodra was able to sing the song "Ibu Kita Kartini" with a better vibrato technique than her peers, even more than those who have taken vocal lessons before.

In 2013, Lyodra practiced vocals with Derta Purba who is also the vocal teacher of the serious solo singer Putri Ayu Silaen. She also practiced playing the organ while serving as a psalmist at mass at the Catholic Church of St. Francis of Assisi, Medan.

Lyodra's ability to sing with the reach of the whistle register was found to be self-taught. When she was still a seventh grader in junior high school, Lyodra imitated Mariah Carey's use of the whistle register in the song "O Holy Night". She has admitted experiencing damage to her vocal cords in 2016 due to excessive singing using the whistle register.

Apart from singing, Lyodra is also studying acting. She was a member of the theater extracurricular while studying at St. Ignasius Junior High School, Medan. In St. Ignasius also took piano extracurricular activities. After graduating from junior high school, Lyodra continued to SMA Santo Thomas 2, Medan. On the sidelines of his busy singing career, Lyodra continued her education at Pelita Harapan University and majored in communication science.

Career

2014: Early career and Indonesian Mencari Bakat 
Lyodra started her career as a national child singer at the Kirana Semen Indonesia 2014 event, which was organized by the BUMN PT Semen Indonesia (Persero) Tbk. After winning the regional round which was held in Medan City, she also advanced to the final in Jakarta, along with 28 other finalists from 28 cities in Indonesia. In the final round at the national level which was held on 31 March 2014, at Djakarta Theater XXI, Central Jakarta, Lyodra took the top four positions and took home the first prize in the form of cash worth 25 million rupiah.

Subsequently, Lyodra appeared as a participant in the Indonesia Mencari Bakat season 4 event which aired on the national television station Trans TV starting 1 August 2014. After going through various stages of competition and eliminating 19 finalists, on 19 October 2014, Lyodra was eliminated in the big six round. After being left out, Lyodra was signed by the record label GUT Records, which was sheltered by musicians Erwin Gutawa and Gita Gutawa. Together with six other children who are considered to have special talents in the field of music, she was chosen as one of the personnel of the music group project called Di Atas Rata-Rata 2 (DARR 2).

2015–2017: Di Atas Rata-Rata second generation 
Lyodra's joining with the management of DARR 2 made him involved in various large-scale musical performances. One of them is the Java Jazz Festival 2016 which was held on 4–6 March at JIExpo Kemayoran, Jakarta. In addition, on 2 April 2016, Lyodra along with six other DARR 2 personnel performed in a concert—which was also attended by the Governor of DKI Jakarta (at that time) Basuki Tjahaja Purnama—entitled "Di Atas Rata-Rata 2: Bikin Konser", taking place at Ciputra Artpreneur, South Jakarta. She and the six DARR 2 personnel also had the opportunity to appear in front of President Joko Widodo and a number of state guests at the commemoration of the 71st Independence Day of the Republic of Indonesia, on 17 August 2016, at the Merdeka Palace.

Less than a year later, Lyodra, who was then 13 years old, took part in an international solo singing competition for children aged 6–15 years, entitled Sanremo Junior 2017, in Sanremo, Italy. Under the direct direction of the DARR 2 vocal coach and choreographer team, she trains intensively every weekend in Jakarta. This made Lyodra have to go back and forth from Medan to Jakarta for almost two months. After completing the pre-competition process, she left for Italy accompanied by Gita Gutawa and sponsored by the Creative Economy Agency of the Republic of Indonesia.

In the peak night of the competition which was held on 3 May 2017, at the Ariston Cinema Building, Sanremo, Lyodra performed the song "Dear Dream" by Gita Gutawa, which was translated by Ria Leimena from the original Indonesian song entitled "Janji Untuk Mimpi". She also managed to become a winner in the competition category he participated in, namely Category A3 (aged 13–15 years), beating nine participants from nine countries. In addition, of the 24 finalists from 18 countries—divided into three categories based on age groups—she was also selected as the only finalist who received a special award from the committee, in the form of the "Prix of Sanremo Junior Committee" trophy.

2019–2020: Indonesian Idol and debut single "Gemintang Hatiku" 
In 2019, Lyodra again participated in a talent search event, this time Indonesian Idol. During the audition she performed Lady Gaga's song "I'll Never Love Again". Lyodra managed to amaze the judged by practicing the use of the whistle register technique and getting a golden ticket. The audition video even managed to occupy the first trending of YouTube Indonesia in a few hours. After passing the audition stage and going through a competition quarantine process for 5 months, on 2 March 2020, she was crowned the winner. As the winner of the tenth seasonof Indonesian Idol. Lyodra received a cash prize of 150,000,000 IDR, as well as one unit of the All New Nissan Livina MPV car. After the show, Lyodra signed a contract with the record label Universal Music Indonesia and was managed by Star Media Nusantara, an artist management company owned by MNC Group. Lyodra was recorded as the youngest winner in the history of Indonesian Idol, at the age of 16 years 8 months 15 days.

From Indonesian Idol, Lyodra got a winning song entitled "Gemintang Hatiku" which became her first single as an adult singer. There are two versions of the song, Lyodra sings a pop ballad version of this song. This song managed to bring Lyodra to win the award as the Pendatang Baru Terdahsyat from the 2020 Dahsyatnya Awards.

2021: Acting debut and solo album Lyodra 
Lyodra made her acting debut in a teen drama web series directed by Rangga Nattra, entitled "7 Hari Sebelum 17 Tahun". In a seven-episode series that will air starting 14 February 2021 on the media service provider application for the digital channel Stro, Lyodra plays an antagonist character named Gina, a temperamental high school student. The series became one of the best television shows in Asia by NME Asia Magazine.

More than a year after winning Indonesian Idol, to be precise on 16 July 2021, Lyodra released their first studio album which was titled homonymously with her stage name. Her solo album, Lyodra, contains eight singles that she popularized herself, four of which are new singles, namely "Kalau Bosan", "Dibanding Dia", "Oe..Oe..Oe..", and "Pesan Terakhir". In this eponymous album, she is assisted by a number of musicians who act as composers and producers, namely Dipha Barus, Ade Nurulianto, Anji, Yovie Widianto, Mario Gerardus Klau, Tohpati, and Laleilmanino. Lyodra's album became her debut solo album as an adult singer under the Universal Music Indonesia label, after more than three years of a career as a child singer in the music group Di Atas Rata-Rata 2 which was raised by GUT Records. The album became one of the most recommended Asian albums by The Victor Magazine.

In October 2021, Lyodra was nominated as "Best Southeast Asian Act" from the 2021 MTV Europe Music Awards held on 14 November 2021, at the László Papp Budapest Sports Arena in Budapest, Hungary after being defeated by JJ Lin from Singapore in the online voting on the official website MTV Europe Music Awards.

In November 2021, Lyodra was the performer of Indonesia's National Day in the series of Expo 2020 at Al Wasl Plaza, Dubai, which was also attended by President Joko Widodo and Crown Prince of Abu Dhabi, Prince Mohammed bin Zayed Al Nahyan. In addition, because of her solo debut album, Lyodra was trusted by Spotify as "Artist of the Month" for the November 2021 period from Indonesia in the context of the Equal campaign program. In the campaign, Lyodra's photo was chosen to be placed on a Times Square digital billboard in New York City, United States.

In December 2021, Lyodra's debut album won the "Album of the Year" from 2021 Indonesian Music Awards which was held at Studio RCTI+, Jakarta, after taking first place in the online voting. Lyodra also won an award as "Best New Asian Artist" from Indonesia at the 2021 Mnet Asian Music Awards which was broadcast live on 11 December 2021, on the Mnet TV channel and the JOOX application which was held at CJ ENM Contents World in Paju, South Korea.

2022: International collaboration, judges debut, and "Sang Dewi"
Starting her career in 2022, Lyodra was awarded the "Musician of the Year" award organized by the social networking app and music video platform from China, TikTok. Not only that, Lyodra is also one of the lists of "Oustanding young people" from Forbes 30 Under 30 Indonesia magazine in 2022 representing art workers in the music field. The magazine contains 30 young people under the age of 30 who inspire the community.

After almost a year after releasing her debut album, precisely on 3 June 2022, Lyodra announced that she would collaborate with British musician with multi-platinum single, Calum Scott. The collaboration is Calum Scott's project to promote one of his songs, "Heaven", which has been released solo by him and will be included in the Bridges album. Calum Scott sang the song again in a duet with 4 singers from Southeast Asia which were popularized by Lyodra (Indonesia), Diana Danielle (Malaysia), Darren Espanto (Philippines), and Hoàng Duyên (Vietnam).

On 7 June 2022, through the official Instagram page of Idola Cilik, Lyodra was chosen to be one of the guest judges in the talent search event with Judika and Aurel Hermansyah. The program aired commercially through RCTI TV channel on 13 June 2022.

In addition, on August 12, 2022, Lyodra released a single with Andi Rianto entitled "Sang Dewi". This single is Lyodra's first collaboration with Indonesian musicians. The teaser of this single was released on YouTube Lyodra Official on August 10, 2022 and has reached 100 thousand viewers who have watched the teaser.

On November 7, 2022, Lyodra was confirmed to be performing at the Asia Artist Awards (AAA) 2022 by the event's Twitter account.  Lyodra was the only Indonesian singer to appear at the event.The event will be held on December 13-14, 2022 in Japan. In December 2022, Lyodra also won the Asia Celebrity Awards category in the music section at the Asia Artist Awards. The award is Lyodra's third international award after Sanremo Junior 2017 and 2021 Mnet Asian Music Awards.

2023: "Ego"
After her success with the remake of Sang Dewi, Lyodra released another single titled "Ego", which will be released on February 10, 2023. This is also Lyodra's first song to be released in 2023.

Artistry

Influence 
On several occasions, Lyodra admitted that she used Beyoncé, Jessie J, Bruno Mars, and Ariana Grande, as her musical inspiration. In particular, she cites Beyoncé's song "Listen", a song she often sings, because it has had a positive influence on her. She also claimed to have been a fan of Mariah Carey since she was in junior high school. In terms of voice reach, Lyodra controls the whistle register, similar to Mariah Carey. In addition, she was noted to have adopted Beyoncé's hoarse voice in her single, "Mengapa Kita Terlanjur Mencinta". Lyodra also once said that Agnez Mo was an inspirational figure for her. Lyodra is known to be fond of Agnez Mo's works, including "Rindu", "Matahariku", "Karena Ku Sanggup", and "Jera". In addition, other singers such as Raisa, Rossa, Judika, Once Mekel, Dua Lipa, and Billie Eilish also indirectly influenced her musical style.

Musical style and voice 
Lyodra has a soprano type of voice. Through her works, she is known as a pop singer. Specifically, the three early singles in Lyodra's career as an adult singer carried the same type of music, namely pop ballads. The singles include "Gemintang Hatiku", "Mengapa Kita Terlanjur Mencinta", "Tentang Kamu", "Kalau Bosan", "Dibanding Dia", and "Pesan Terakhir". In addition, there are two Lyodra singles that carry different types of music, namely the single entitled "Sabda Rindu" which carries the color of pop music with a more cheerful rhythm of riffs and runs typical of R&B music and "Oee.. Oee... Oee" which carries the color of EDM music with the use of lyrics in the Batak Karo language.

Salman Achmad of Hai wrote that Lyodra "has the power of a voice to reach high notes" and "his vocal character is very strong". Diana Rafikasari from Sindonews classifies Lyodra as a singer who is "very capable of processing slow tempo songs". Meanwhile, the official website for the children's music group Di Atas Rata Rata 2 described Lyodra's vocal character as "strong in bringing powerful pop songs". Not only capable in terms of vocals, Lyodra is also able to convey the feelings & emotions contained in each of her song lyrics.

Discography

Studio album

Compilation album

Singles

Songwriting credits

Filmography

Film

Web series

Television show

Videography

Music videos

Endorsement

Concert and tours

Concert participation
 Di Atas Rata-Rata 2: Bikin Konser (2016)
 Java Jazz Festival, JIExpo Kemayoran (2016)
 Konser 25 Tahun Rossa, Jakarta (2021) - RCTI
 Konser Teristimewa Raisa, Jakarta (2022) - Trans TV
 Rossa 25 Shining Years Concert, Jakarta dan Medan (2022)
 Indra Lesmana Legacy Concert, Jakarta, Bandung, Yogyakarta, dan Bali (2022)
 Konser Kejar Mimpi (2022)
 Calum Scott 'Bridges' Asia Tour, Jakarta (2022)
 Dream Festival 19 October 2022 (2022)
 We the Fest, Jakarta (2022)
 Jisphoria, Jakarta (2022)

Awards and nominations 

!
|-
| rowspan="2"| 2016
|-
| Best Children's Music Duo/Group/Vocal/Collaboration / "Stop Bully" 
| AMI Awards
| 
| 
|-
| rowspan="3"| 2017
|-
| Outstanding Child Artist / "Stop Bully" 
| Dahsyatnya Awards 2017
| 
| 
|-
| Best Children Female Solo Artist / "Dear Dream"
| AMI Awards
| 
| 
|-
|rowspan="7"| 2020
|-
|Outstanding Newcomer
|rowspan="2"| Dahsyatnya Awards 2020
|
|rowspan="2"| 
|-
|Outstanding Gang
|
|-
|Most Favorite Celebrity Live Chat
|rowspan="2"| RCTI+ Indonesian Digital Awards
|
|rowspan="2"| 
|-
|Digital Darling Female Rider
|
|-
|Best Newcomer Singer
|Silet Awards
|
|
|-
| Best Pop Female Solo Singer / "Mengapa Kita Terlanjur Mencinta"
|AMI Awards
|
|
|-
|rowspan="10"| 2021
|Most Obsessed Young Celebrity
|Obsesi Awards 2021
|
|
|-
|Best Southeast Asian Act
|2021 MTV Europe Music Awards
|
|
|-
| Best Pop Female Solo Artist / "Tentang Kamu"
|AMI Awards
|
|
|-
|Voice of Clarity
|The Masterpiece & I Fashion Festival 2021
|
|
|-
|Album of the Year / Lyodra
|rowspan="3"| Indonesian Music Awards 2021
|
|
|-
|Female Singer of the Year / "Pesan Terakhir"
|
|rowspan="2"| 
|-
|Social Media Artist of the Year / "Pesan Terakhir"
|
|-
|Best New Asian Artist (Indonesia)
|2021 Mnet Asian Music Awards
|
|
|-
|Most Favorite Indonesian Singer
|Line Today Choice 2021
|
|
|-
|Uprising Singer of The Year
|Go Spot Awards 2021
|
|-
|rowspan="15"|2022
|Musician Of The Year
|TikTok Awards Indonesia 2021
|
|-
|Most Popular Female Solo Singer
|rowspan="2"|SCTV Music Awards 2022
|
|-
|Most Popular Pop Songs "Pesan Terakhir"
|
|-
|Most Popular Female Solo Pop Singer 
|rowspan="4" | Bandung Music Awards 2022  
|
|-
|Most Popular Newcomer Singer 
|
|-
|Most Popular Video Clip 
|
|-
|Most Popular Songs
|
|-
|Best-Best Album 
|rowspan="4" |Anugerah Musik Indonesia 2022
|
|-
|Best Pop Album 
|
|-
|Best Female Pop Solo Artist 
|
|-
|The Best Production Works
|
|-
|Most Popular Television Drama Soundtracks (Pesan Terakhir - Cinta 2 Pilihan)
|SCTV Awards 2022
|
|-
|Female Singer of The Year 
|rowspan="2" | Indonesian Music Awards 2022 
| 
|-
|Collaboration of The Year (Sang Dewi) 
|
|-
|Asia Celebrity Award — Music
|7th Asia Artist Awards
|
|-

 There are several awards with several recipients, including Indonesia's Beautiful Women 2021. For the simplicity and to avoid error/mistakes, the other awards are listed in the "Special Awards" menu.

Special awards 

Lyodra became one of nine person who receive Indonesia's Beautiful Women 2021 by HighEnd Magazine.
Lyodra receive "Best Dresser" with Krisdayanti at "Embracing Womanhood" IBW 2021 by HighEnd Magazine.
Lyodra gets Spotify Wrapped ID 2021 Awards among great Indonesian artist. Lyodra is the most inspirational Indonesian artist and her songs has been saved over 700.000 times on Spotify.
In 2021, Lyodra was nominated for TC Candler's 100 most beautiful women and ranked 8th.
In 2022,Lyodra is again nominated forTC candler's 100 most beautiful women and ranked 11th.

Notes

References

External links 
 
 

Living people
2003 births
Karo people
Indonesian Christians
Indonesian Catholics
Indonesian child singers
21st-century Indonesian women singers
Indonesian pop singers
Indonesian rhythm and blues singers
Indonesian Idol winners
People from Medan
Anugerah Musik Indonesia winners